An eki stamp (train station stamp) is a free collectible rubber ink stamp, which is found at many train stations in Japan and Taiwan. Their designs typically feature imagery emblematic of the station's associated city or surrounding area, such as landmarks, mascots, and locally produced goods.

Eki stamps have existed since at least 1931, when one was installed at a station in Fukui and shortly thereafter, eki stamps were installed at major stations throughout Japan. Today, eki stamps exist at nearly all staffed train stations in Japan. Eki stamps also commonly exist at other passenger points of boarding like subway stations, airports, ports, and highway service areas.

References

Rail transport in Japan
Tourism in Japan